Socialist Democracy is the successor to People's Democracy, a left-wing current which emerged in Belfast in 1968 during the civil rights movement in Northern Ireland. During the 1970s it evolved towards Trotskyist positions and, by merging with the Dublin-based Movement for a Socialist Republic, became a section of the Fourth International. After the hunger strike campaign Peoples Democracy shrank in size with some leading members joining Sinn Féin when it began to take more explicit left-wing positions.

In the early 1990s the remaining members of People's Democracy initiated the Irish Committee for a Marxist Programme as an attempt to regroup socialists and left-wing republicans. This project ended in 1996 when PD dissolved and reconstituted itself as Socialist Democracy, adopting the programme put forward by the ICMP.

The party is opposed to the Good Friday Agreement which is regards as "...an attempt to strengthen imperialist rule, reinforce partition and bolster the sectarianism that helps prevent the unity of the working class.".

Socialist Democracy has a small membership mainly based in Belfast. In 2004 it fused with the International Socialists, a group of former members of the Socialist Workers Party in that city.

It has not often contested elections, but one of its members stood in the Northern Ireland Assembly election of May 2011. It remains affiliated to the Fourth International. It is the sympathising Irish section of the International, within which it has been critical of tactics undertaken by its sister organisations in Brazil and France. Like the majority in the Fourth International, it was critical of the evolution of the Socialist Democracy current of the Workers' Party in Brazil. It was also critical of the Revolutionary Communist League's call for a vote against Le Pen in the 2002 French presidential election, rather than for a boycott.

The party is opposed to Transgender rights and Queer Theory.

Socialist Democracy (Ireland) left the Fourth International in December 2022.

Pamphlets
Socialist Democracy also publishes a series of pamphlets on left-wing subjects, including:
Ireland: The Promise of Socialism  by Joe Craig, John McAnulty and Paul Flannigan (1996).
The Real Irish Peace Process by Joe Craig, John McAnulty and Paul Flannigan (1998).
Prisoners of Social Partnership by Joe Craig (2002)
Marxism and the National Question by Pietro Tresso (Blasco) –(Introduction and Notes by D. R. O'Connor Lysaght (2006)).
The Soul of Man under Socialism by Oscar Wilde (Introduction and Notes by Lysaght (SD 2005)).
The Great Irish Revolution: Myths and Realities by D.R. O’Connor Lysaght (A Marxist critique of R. F. Foster and other Irish historians in the revisionist movement (2006)).
Ireland's Credit Crunch by Kevin Keating, Jonathan Morrison, Joe Corrigan. (2010). Publisher: IMG Publications

References

External links
Socialist Democracy website
Merger with the International Socialists

1996 establishments in Ireland
All-Ireland political parties
Far-left politics in Ireland
Fourth International (post-reunification)
Irish republican parties
Political parties established in 1996
Political parties in Northern Ireland
Socialist parties in Ireland
Trotskyist organisations in Ireland
Trotskyist organisations in Northern Ireland